Andrzej Tomasz Piaseczny (born Pionki, 6 January 1971) more commonly known as Piasek, is a Polish singer, songwriter, actor, and television personality. Former Mafia singer, Member of the Phonographic Academy of ZPAV. In the years 1997–2010 he performed in the TV series Złotopolscy, where he played the singer Kacper "Górniak" Złotopolski. His solo career began in 1998. In the same year he performed in a duet with Natalia Kukulska, with whom he recorded the song "You Are Near Me", and also released a solo single "I Know My Way", used in the soundtrack to the movie The Magic Sword – Camelot Legend. Piasek represented Poland in the Eurovision Song Contest 2001 with his up-tempo dance song "2 Long". Since 2008, the artist has collaborated with Seweryn Krajewski.

Biography

Childhood and education 
Andrzej Piaseczny was born on 6 January 1971 in Pionki near Radom. He became interested in music in his childhood, performing in the Cavatin school band. After graduating from high school, he enrolled at WSP in Kielce. He studied music education. He has an older brother, a judge and harpist ZHR Krzysztof Piaseczny, and a younger sister Basia.

Music career

1992–97: Cooperation with the Mafia band and Robert Chojnacki 
In 1992, Piaseczny joined the Mafia band. In the same year he took part in the contest of young talents in Wroclaw and in the concert "Debiuty" at the Festival in Opole. Mafia's debut album of the same title was released on 3 November 1993 by the Kraków-based record company TOP Music. In February 1995, Mafia's second studio album, Gabinety, was released. The recordings were promoted by ballad titled "Noce całe", but a large part of the album was rock songs. Also in 1995, album of saxophonist Robert Chojnacki, which was recorded with Piaseczny and entitled Sax & Sex was released. In 1996, the album was certified double platinum. Also in 1996 album Sax & Dance was released, which featured remixed songs from Sax & Sex. That same year, the latest Mafia album recorded with Piaseczny entitled FM. In 1997, Piaseczny together with the group recorded the single "Wolność jest w nas" promoting the film entitled "Sara". Later that year, he ended his cooperation with the band.

1998–99: Piasek and Country Songs Festival of the Baltic States 
In early 1998, the singer's debut solo album Piasek was released. Album spawned the singles "Mocniej" and "Jeszcze bliżej", as well as the song "Pogodniej (Złoty środek)", which used as the main theme of the music series Złotopolscy. Also in 1998, song "Wciąż bardziej obcy" recorded by Piaseczny with the guest participation of Jan Borysewicz from Lady Pank, as well as two songs performed in collaboration with Natalia Kukulska – "Jesteś blisko mnie" and "Znam drogę swą" were released. In 1999 the singer took part in Karlshamn's Baltic Songs Festival. During the concert he sang the composition "Jeszcze biżej", thanks to which he won the second prize and the Audience Award.

2000–02: Popers and the Eurovision Song Contest 
On 16 February 2000, his second solo album entitled Popers was released. Ewa Bem, jazz musician Wojciech Karolak, bassist Vail Johns and saxophonist Eric Marienthal participated in the recording. As part of the promotion at the Polish Theater in Warsaw, Piaseczny played a concert called Piasek and Friends, which guest stars included Jan Borysewicz, Reni Jusis and Anna Przybylska. In February 2001, the singer was chosen internally by Polish Television to represent Poland during the 46th Eurovision Song Contest, which was held in Copenhagen in May 2001. He sang the song "2 Long" and finished 20th from a field of 23 participating countries with 11 points, 2 points from which were given by Sweden, 3 points by Slovenia, 5 points by Germany and 1 point by Denmark. After the Eurovision final he was awarded the Barbara Dex Award as the worst dressed participant of the competition according to the Internet poll.

In 2002 the song "Oj Kot" was released. The song promoted the movie Revenge, directed by Andrzej Wajda.

2003–05: Andrzej Piaseczny and Jednym tchem 
On 10 November 2003, his third studio album, Andrzej Piaseczny, was released. The album was promoted by singles "Szczęście jest blisko", "Teraz płacz" and "Jedna na milion". The album reached the 13th position of Polish chart OLiS. In 2004, Piaseczny participated in an Olympic fire relay at the Athens Summer Olympics. In September of the same year, Krzysztof Krawczyk's single "Przytul me życie" was released in a duet with Piaseczny.

In 2005, Piaseczny took part in the recordings of the album entitled "Words" containing songs composed from the poems of John Paul II. On 3 September 2005 Piaseczny performed at the Festival in Sopot, where he sang the song Z głębi duszy", thanks to which he won the main award of Bursztynowy Słowik. On 19 September, his fourth solo album titled Jednym tchem was released, which at the end of 2006 was gained the platinum status in Poland.

Also in 2005, Robert Chojnacki's solo album, Saxophonic, was released, featuring Piaseczny. In December 2005, Piaseczny appeared in the program "Arie z uśmiechem" broadcast on TVP2, where he sang two opera arias: "Dziewczyno Ty moja" and "Usta milczą, dusza śpiewa" together with Katarzyna Cerekwicka. In 2007 Piaseczny performed at the TOPtrenda Festival in Sopot, and also participated in Seweryn Krajewski's recital entitled "Niebo z moich stron" ("Heaven from My Parties") which took place at the National Festival of Polish Songs in Opole.

2008–09: 15 dni, Spis rzeczy ulubionych 

On 7 April 2008, on the occasion of the fifteen years of Piaseczny's artistic activity, album entitled "15 dni" was released. "15 dni" featured his most popular songs and two new songs: „Komu potrzebny żal” and „15 dni”. At the end of March 2009, his fourth solo album entitled "Spis rzeczy ulubionych" was released. The album was composed by Seweryn Krajewski. One of the singles from the album - "Chodź, przytul, przebacz", was honored in the music program "Hit Generator". On 30 November 2008 Piaseczny and Seweryn Krajewski's concert album titled "Na przekór nowym czasom – live" was released.

In January 2010, the singer received Telekamera award in the Music category. On 15 April 2011, Piaseczny and Stanislaw Sojka's album, "W blasku światła" was released.

2011–14: To co dobre 
In Autumn 2011, Piaseczny, along with Katarzyna "Kayah" Rooijens, Anna Dąbrowska and Adam "Nergal" Darski, became a jury member of The Voice of Poland, which premiered in September on TVP2.

On 23 January 2012, Piaseczny's solo album titled "To co dobre" was released. In order to promote the album, singles „To co dobre, to co lepsze” and „Z dwojga ciał” were released. The album reached the first place in Polish chart OLiS. Also in 2012, Piaseczny took part in the third edition of the Bitwa na głosy, which he won with his team from Kielce.

In 2014, he performed as a guest in the finals of the show Dancing with the Stars.

From 2015 : Kalejdoskop and The Voice of Poland 
At the end of March 2015, Piaseczny's new album entitled Kalejdoskop was released. The album was recorded with Metropole Orkest. In order to promote th album, singles "Kalejdoskop szczęścia” and „O sobie samym” were released.

On 5 March 2016, he performed as a special guest of Polish national selection for the Eurovision Song Contest. During the show, he performed three songs: „Kalejdoskop szczęścia” and „W świetle dnia” and the "Ostatni".

In the fall of 2015, 2016 and 2017, he again sat on the jury of The Voice of Poland. In 2019-2021 he was one of the coaches in first and second season of The Voice Senior.

In the summer of 2021 it was announced that he will be one of the judges in the 25th season of Dancing with the Stars: Taniec z gwiazdami on Polsat.

Personal life 
The artist came out as gay on 7 May 2021 in an interview with Radio Zet.

Discography

Solo albums

Collaborative albums

Other albums

Filmography

Prizes and awards

References

External links

 

1971 births
Living people
People from Radom County
Eurovision Song Contest entrants for Poland
Eurovision Song Contest entrants of 2001
Polish pop singers
Polish lyricists
21st-century Polish male singers
Polish gay actors
Polish gay musicians
Polish LGBT singers
Polish LGBT songwriters
Gay singers
Gay songwriters
20th-century Polish LGBT people
21st-century Polish LGBT people